Hotel Aurora  or Aurora Hotel may refer to:

Chad 

Aurora Hotel (Chad)

United States 
Aurora Apartment Hotel, a high-rise apartment building in San Antonio, Texas
Aurora Hotel (Worcester, Massachusetts), listed on the NRHP in Massachusetts
Hotel Aurora (Aurora, Illinois), listed on the NRHP in Illinois